James Edward Heath (October 25, 1926 – January 19, 2020), nicknamed Little Bird, was an American jazz saxophonist, composer, arranger, and big band leader. He was the brother of bassist Percy Heath and drummer Albert Heath.

Biography
Heath was born in Philadelphia on October 25, 1926. His father, an auto mechanic, played the clarinet, performing on the weekends. His mother sang in a church choir. The family frequently played recordings of big band jazz groups around the house. Heath's sister was a pianist, while his brothers were bassist Percy Heath (older) and drummer Albert Heath (his youngest sibling).

During World War II, Heath was rejected for the draft for being below the minimum weight.

Heath originally played alto saxophone. He earned the nickname "Little Bird" after his work for Howard McGhee and Dizzy Gillespie in the late 1940s, during which his playing displayed influences from Charlie Parker (Parker's nickname was "Bird"). He then switched to tenor saxophone.

From late 1945 through most of 1946, he performed with the Nat Towles band. In 1946, he formed his own band, which was a fixture on the Philadelphia jazz scene until 1949. The band included John Coltrane, Benny Golson, Specs Wright, Cal Massey, Johnny Coles, Ray Bryant, and Nelson Boyd. Charlie Parker and Max Roach sat in on one occasion. The band performed at venues such as the Apollo Theater in Harlem. Although Heath recalls that the band recorded a few demos on acetate, it never released any recordings, and its arrangements were lost at a Chicago train station. The band dissolved in 1949 so that Heath could join Dizzy Gillespie's band.

Heath was arrested and convicted twice for the sale of heroin; he was an acknowledged addict. The first time, in the spring of 1954, he was sent to the Federal Medical Center, Lexington, Kentucky, where many musicians and celebrities (and other people) were given treatment.  After release, In early 1955, still an addict, he was arrested again, and served most of a six-year prison sentence in Lewisburg.  He went cold turkey, and was able to spend a lot of his time engaged in music. While in prison he actually composed most of the Chet Baker and Art Pepper album Playboys (1956). He was released early, on May 21, 1959, and remained clean for the rest of his life; conditions of probation made it difficult, but he managed to start rebuilding his career.

He briefly joined Miles Davis's group in 1959, replacing Coltrane, and also worked with Kenny Dorham and Gil Evans. Heath recorded extensively as leader and sideman. During the 1960s, he frequently worked with Milt Jackson and Art Farmer.

In 1975, he and his brothers formed the Heath Brothers, also featuring pianist Stanley Cowell.

Jimmy Heath composed "For Minors Only", "Picture of Heath", "Bruh' Slim", and "CTA" and recorded them on his 1975 album Picture of Heath.

In the 1980s, Heath joined the faculty of the Aaron Copland School of Music at Queens College, City University of New York.  With the rank of Professor, he led the creation of the Jazz Program at Queens College and attracted prominent musicians such as Donald Byrd to the campus. He also served on the board of the Louis Armstrong Archives on campus, and the restoration and management of the Louis and Lucille Armstrong Residence in Corona, Queens, near his own home. In addition to teaching at Queens College for more than 20 years, he also taught at Jazzmobile.

Personal life
At a coming-home party the night after his release from Lewisburg Penitentiary, he met his eventual wife, Mona Brown, whom he married in 1960; they had two children, Roslyn and Jeffrey.

Heath was the father of R&B songwriter/musician James Mtume.

In 2010 his autobiography I Walked With Giants was published by the Temple University Press.  Heath stood just 5 feet, 3 inches.

He notably played in a jazz concert at the White House, when President Bill Clinton borrowed his saxophone for one number.

Heath died on January 19, 2020, in Loganville, Georgia, of natural causes.

Awards and legacy 
He received a Grammy nomination for box-set liner notes of The Heavyweight Champion, John Coltrane, the Complete Atlantic Recordings (Rhino, 1995), and Grammy nominations for Little Man Big Band (Verve, 1994) and Live at the Public Theatre with The Heath Brothers (Columbia, 1980).

Heath was a recipient of the 2003 NEA Jazz Masters Award. In 2004, he was awarded an honorary Doctorate in Human Letters.

During his career, Heath performed on more than 100 albums, including seven with the Heath Brothers and 12 as a leader. He wrote more than 125 compositions, many of which have become jazz standards and have been recorded by other artists, including Art Farmer, Cannonball Adderley, Clark Terry, Chet Baker, Miles Davis, James Moody, Milt Jackson, Ahmad Jamal, Ray Charles, Dizzy Gillespie, J. J. Johnson, and Dexter Gordon. Heath also composed extended works – seven suites and two string quartets – and premiered his first symphonic work, Three Ears, in 1988 at Queens College, with Maurice Peress conducting.

Books

Discography
Sources:

As leader

1959: The Thumper (Riverside)
1960: Really Big! (Riverside)
1961: The Quota (Riverside)
1962: Triple Threat (Riverside)
1963: Swamp Seed (Riverside)
1964:	Fast Company (Milestone)
1964:	Nice People (Original Jazz Classics)
1964: On the Trail (Riverside)
1965: Jam Gems: Live at the Left Bank (Label M – released 2001) – with Freddie Hubbard
1972: The Gap Sealer (Cobblestone) – also released as Jimmy (Muse)
1973: Love and Understanding (Muse)
1974: The Time and the Place (Landmark – released 1994)
1975: Picture of Heath (Xanadu)
1985: New Picture (Landmark)
1987: Peer Pleasure (Landmark)
1991: You've Changed (SteepleChase)
1992: Little Man Big Band (Verve)
1995: You or Me (SteepleChase)
2006: Turn Up the Heath (Planet Arts)
2010: Endless Search (Origin)
2012:	Our Jazz Family(JZAZ Records)
2014: Togetherness:Live at the Blue Note  (Jazz Legacy Productions)
2014:  My Ideal (Jazz Elite S.P.) (digital)
2020:  Love Letter (Impulse!)

With the Heath Brothers

 1975: Marchin' On (Strata-East Records)
 1978: Passin' Thru (Columbia Records)
 1979: Live at the Public Theatre (Columbia Records])
 1979: In Motion (Columbia Records)
 1980: Expressions of Life (Columbia Records)
 1981: Brotherly Love (Antilles Records)
 1981: Brothers and Others (Antilles Records)
 1997: As We Were Saying (Concord Records)
 1998: Jazz Family (Concord Records)
 2009: Endurance (Jazz Legacy Productions)

As sideman

With Nat Adderley

 That's Right! (Riverside, 1960)
With Donald Byrd
 Up with Donald Byrd (Verve, 1965)
With Benny Carter
Over the Rainbow (MusicMasters, 1989)
With Stanley Cowell
 Regeneration (Strata-East, 1976)
With Continuum
 Mad About Tadd (Palo Alto, 1980)
With Miles Davis 
 Miles Davis Volume 2 (Blue Note, 1953) reissued mostly on Miles Davis Vol 1 - 12 inch LP

With Kenny Dorham
 Kenny Dorham Quintet (Debut, 1953)
 Showboat (Time, 1960)

With Charles Earland
 Black Drops (Prestige, 1970)

With Art Farmer
 The Time and the Place: The Lost Concert (Mosaic, 1966) - released 2007
 The Art Farmer Quintet Plays the Great Jazz Hits (Columbia, 1967)
 The Time and the Place (Columbia, 1967)
 Homecoming (Mainstream, 1971)

With Curtis Fuller
 Soul Trombone (Impulse!, 1962)
 Smokin' (Mainstream, 1972)

With Red Garland
 The Quota (MPS, 1971)
With Bunky Green
My Babe (Vee-Jay, 1960 [1965])

With Johnny Hartman
  I've Been There (PErception, 1973)

With Albert Heath
  Kwanza (The First) (Muse, 1973)

With Elmo Hope
 Homecoming! (Riverside, 1961)

With Freddie Hubbard 
 Hub Cap (Blue Note, 1961)

With Milt Jackson
 Vibrations (Atlantic, 1961)
 Big Bags (Riverside, 1962)
 Invitation (Riverside, 1962)
 Statements (Impulse!, 1962)
 Milt Jackson Quintet Live at the Village Gate (Riverside, 1962)
 Jazz 'n' Samba  (Impulse! 1964)
 In a New Setting (Limelight, 1964)
 Ray Brown / Milt Jackson with Ray Brown (Verve, 1965)
 Born Free (Limelight, 1966)
 Olinga (CTI, 1974)

With J. J. Johnson
 All Stars (with Clifford Brown) (Blue Note, 1953) reissued as The Eminent Jay Jay Johnson Volume 1 (1957)

With Carmell Jones
 Jay Hawk Talk (Prestige, 1965)

With Sam Jones
 The Soul Society (Riverside, 1960)
 The Chant (Riverside, 1961)
 Down Home (Riverside, 1962)

With Herbie Mann
 Latin Mann (Columbia, 1965)
 Big Boss Mann (1970)

With Howard McGhee
 Howard McGhee and Milt Jackson (Savoy, 1948)

With Blue Mitchell
 Blue Soul (Riverside, 1959)
 A Sure Thing (Riverside, 1962)

With the Modern Jazz Quartet
 MJQ & Friends: A 40th Anniversary Celebration (Atlantic, 1994)

With Don Patterson
 These Are Soulful Days (Muse, 1972

With Pony Poindexter
 Pony's Express (Epic, 1962)

With Julian Priester
 Keep Swingin' (Riverside. 1960)

With Don Sickler
 The Music of Kenny Dorham (Reservoir, 1983)

With Don Sleet
 All Members (Jazzland, 1961)

With Cal Tjader
 Soul Sauce (Verve, 1965)

With Charles Tolliver
  Music Inc. (Strata-East, 1970)

With Diego Urcola
 Viva (Cam Jazz, 2007)

With Gerald Wilson
 New York, New Sound (Mack Avenue, 2003)

With Nancy Wilson
  Turned to Blue (2006)

References

External links
 Official website

 Brotherly Jazz:The Heath Brothers - DVD Documentary
 Jimmy Heath's oral history video excerpts at The National Visionary Leadership Project
 B.S.O Chico y Rita Film.

1926 births
2020 deaths
African-American saxophonists
American jazz tenor saxophonists
American male saxophonists
Cobblestone Records artists
Columbia Records artists
Hard bop saxophonists
Landmark Records artists
Mainstream jazz saxophonists
Miles Davis
Milestone Records artists
Muse Records artists
Musicians from Philadelphia
Jazz musicians from Pennsylvania
People from Corona, Queens
Post-bop saxophonists
Riverside Records artists
SteepleChase Records artists
Verve Records artists
Bebop saxophonists
Jazz musicians from New York (state)
21st-century saxophonists
American male jazz musicians
Heath Brothers members
American Jazz Orchestra members
20th-century saxophonists
American jazz educators
21st-century African-American people